Ernesto Palacio (born October 19, 1946, Lima) is a Peruvian tenor, particularly associated with Rossini and Mozart roles.

Palacio first studied theology before turning to music. He began his vocal studies in Milan, and after winning first prize in the "Voci Nuovi Rossiniane" competition organized by RAI in 1972, he made his debut on radio as Lindoro in L'italiana in Algeri.

He quickly sang all over Italy, including at La Scala in Milan and the San Carlo in Naples. He also appeared at the Royal Opera House in London, the Aix-en-Provence Festival, at the Liceo in Barcelona, etc.

He also enjoyed a successful career in North and South America, appearing at the Metropolitan Opera in New York, Houston and Dallas, the Teatro Colón in Buenos Aires, and Caracas.

One of the finest contemporary tenore di grazia, he possesses a 
small but well projected voice of considerable range and agility, used
with fine musicianship, excelling in the Rossini-Donizetti-Bellini repertory, but also in Mozart and Cimarosa.

He can be heard on a number of recordings, notably in L'italiana in Algeri, opposite Marilyn Horne, and in Maometto II, opposite June Anderson and Samuel Ramey, both under Claudio Scimone.

He has been lately active as a vocal coach and artist manager, notably of Juan Diego Florez.

Sources

 The Complete Dictionary of Opera & Operetta, James Anderson, (Wings Books, 1993).

External links
 Ernesto Palacio Artists Management

1946 births
Peruvian operatic tenors
Living people
Singers from Lima
20th-century male opera singers